Crabbie is a surname. Notable people with the surname include:

George Crabbie, Scottish rugby union player
John Crabbie, Scottish rugby union player, brother of George

See also
Crabbie's, a Scottish drink brand 
Lucy's Crabbie Cabbie, a roller coaster in South Carolina, United States